Shahid is an Arabic content streaming platform, headquartered in Dubai, United Arab Emirates and Riyadh, Saudi Arabia. Founded by MBC Group.

The platform was launched in 2008 and rebranded in 2020. More than 27 million unique monthly users were reported by the end of Ramadan 2019, and it managed to capture a market share of 85% VOD viewership in the MENA.

The senior management of Shahid consists of Sam Barnett, MBC GROUP’s CEO; Jakob Mejlhede Andersen serving as the Chief Content Officer (CCO) and Dominic Farrell as Chief Technology Officer (CTO) for Shahid. The platform is available in 23 countries, including MENA region, Australia, United Kingdom, France, Switzerland, Belgium, Spain, US and Canada (except Israel).

The content provided by Shahid VIP includes Shahid Original series, long window premieres, pre-theatrical movies, access to MBC’s TV channels in true HD, as well as western content, documentaries and offering for kids. Furthermore, Shahid VIP also offers International content of partner TV channels.

History

Launch, revamp and rebranding 
It was launched in 2008 titled MBC Shahid Online, a platform created to allow  MBC users to view its TV programmes at their own convenience. The platform only had archives of the MBC’s content and served as a ‘catch-up’ service for MBC’s channels.

2009 – Launched Shahid.net

In 2009, MBC extended Shahid Online to Shahid.net – a free Video on Demand streaming platform (AVOD), which was made available in multiple regions. In July 2012, the Shahid app was launched and it reached the top slot on the App store for Middle East and North Africa in a week's time.

2014 – Introduced SVOD service

The premium subscription-based service ‘Shahid PLUS’ (now Shahid VIP) was launched in 2014, which provided users with a variant of the free video on demand (VOD) service. Thereby, allowing subscribers to view all the available content without the interruption of any advertisements.

In 2019, the platform provided the audiences outside the MENA region access to the regular MBC programmes. The first episode of all the shows was made available for free, while the rest of the episodes were available through the subscription service of Shahid PLUS. This resulted in 2x increase in unique users outside of the MENA region.

2020 – Revamp and rebranding - Shahid VIP, the premium subscription-based service

In 2020, Shahid VIP went through rebranding and technical advancement. The revamped Shahid was launched during a ceremony held at the Dubai Opera on January 15, 2020. The Burj Khalifa was lit up with the slogan ‘It’s our Time’ marking the launch of the rebranded platform.

The offerings of the platform in both the free (Shahid) and paid tier (Shahid VIP) were re-strategized. The paid tier was rebranded as ‘Shahid VIP’ and the platform increased the ease of viewing, speed, quality of streaming, improved discoverability of the relevant content by providing access through mobile phones and various large TV screens using Chromecast and AirPlay functionality; followed by the launch of its app on all major connected TV platforms — Smart TVs and streaming players. Additionally, the rebranding included new features such as the English interface for the platform and login functionality using mobile number or Apple ID. The video streaming service also transitioned to the cloud infrastructure. Shahid VIP launched its branded remote control button in October 2020.

Shahid VIP partnerships 
Shahid VIP has been entering into strategic partnerships with relevant companies to increase accessibility. It started with  a partnership with Viva in 2015, the telecom operator in Kuwait, which facilitated subscriber payment via their mobile phones.

In 2018, a partnership took place with Omantel, the telecom provider in Oman giving its users access to Shahid PLUS subscription. Vodafone Egypt entered the network in 2020 making Shahid VIP available for Vodafone subscribers without any additional costs. In Saudi Arabia, Shahid VIP content is provided through Saudi Telecom Company (STC), which started with a partnership between the two companies in May 2020 and a free two-month subscription to Shahid VIP was given to all STC users.

Shahid partnered with the Samsung in 2014 allowing the users to access Shahid VIP’s content via Shahid.net app. In 2018, TCL made Shahid VIP’s content accessible for its TV users via the Shahid app in MENA markets. Sony TV MENA started embedding the Shahid app in its new TVs from May 2020. Shahid VIP is also available on all VIDAA Smart OS-powered Hisense smart TVs globally, as well as on select Toshiba, Tornado, Wansa, and G-guard models. Amazon Fire TV, Apple TV and Xiaomi Mi Box streaming devices also support the programming through Shahid app.

Entertainment Content 
Shahid provides original and premium content along with content from the media partners.

Shahid originals 

Shahid started with its originals productions in 2019, making the premium Arabic content available to its subscribers on Shahid VIP. The first Shahid Original series was ‘El Diva’, a drama series with Cyrine Abdel Nour and Yacob Alfarhan. Other Shahid Original series include: Every Week has a Friday, Lock Down, Khrays, This is Earth, Al Shak, Fixer, Karimophobia, Blood Oath, Beirut 6:07, The Thief, The Case, Mamlakat Iblis, Al Daheeh Museum, This Other Thing, Fixer, The Building, and many more.

Shahid premieres 
Shahid VIP Premieres include coming soon MBC shows and dramas added to the platform with an exclusive preview window prior to going on-air on MBC TV channels. Once aired, the content remains available for binge watching on Shahid VIP. Some of Shahid Premieres include: “Wasiyat Badr”, “Aswad Fateh”, “Bodyguard”, ”La Hokm Alayh”, ”Leh La’a”, ”AL Leiba season 1 & 2”, “Adani AL Aib“, “Dantelle”, “Bloodline”, “DNA” and many more.

Arabic movies 
Shahid also features Arabic movies, which are exclusively available on Shahid VIP directly after theatrical release. Shahid VIP introduced the concept of pre-theatrical release of movies in the region with the release of the first pre-theatrical film ‘Saheb El Makam’, starring Yousra and Asser Yassin.

Previews 
Shahid previews include series and titles that are released first on Shahid VIP with a preview window of 24h before they are aired on one of the MBC channels allowing subscribers to watch them first on Shahid VIP. Some previews include: “Arous Beirut” (Seasons 1 and 2), “Al Hayba” (including all-new Season 4), Abshar Bel Saad and much more.

Live TV 
Live streaming of all MBC TV channels is available on the platform, including MBC1, MBC2, MBC3, MBC4, MBC5, MBC ACTION, MBC MAX, MBC PERSIA, MBC BOLLYWOOD, and MBC DRAMA. Rotana TV channels are also streamed live on Shahid VIP. These include Rotana Cinema, Rotana Khalijia, Rotana+, Rotana Classic, Rotana Kids, Rotana Drama and Rotana Music.

The Lebanese Broadcasting Corporation (LBCI) started streaming on the platform in July 2020. Al Arabiya, Wanasah, and Panorama FM, as well as Cartoon Network and Spacetoons are also streamed live on Shahid.

Western and international content 
Shahid VIP has partnered with Disney and Fox to offer their extensive content on the platform, which is around 3000 hours long including the animated classics, the Marvel series, and Star Wars. The content is made available with Arabic subtitles. In addition, Shahid offers a library of Hollywood and Bollywood titles.

Documentaries and real-life stories 
Shahid VIP offers best in class Arabic documentaries including Al Arabiya Documentaries and much more. In 2020, Shahid VIP signed a partnership with iwonder, Asia-Pacific’s subscription video on demand (SVOD) platform dedicated to factual films, documentaries, and real-life stories.

Content for kids 
Shahid VIP provides kids programming through live feed from Kids Linear Channels MBC3, CN, Spacetoon and Rotana Kids. The platform provides special parental control features to ensure safe watching.  Shahid VIP struck a deal with Warner Media in 2020 to bring Cartoon Network Arabia on board. Entertainment and educational content from MBC3, Spacetoon, Pixar and Nickelodeon is also streamed on Shahid VIP.

Sports Content

Shahid broadcast sports content in cooperation with SSC

Football 
 Saudi Professional League
 Kings Cup (Saudi Arabia)
 Saudi Super Cup
 Copa del Rey 
 AFC Champions League
 AFC Cup
 2022 FIFA World Cup qualification (AFC)
 2023 AFC Asian Cup
 2022 FIFA World Cup qualification (CAF)
 FIFA Club World Cup UAE 2021
 2022 FIFA Club World Cup
 Supercopa de España
 AFC Women's Asian Cup India 2022
Campeonato Brasileiro Série A
Primeira Liga
Portuguese League Cup

Motorsport 
 Formula 1
 Formula 2
 Formula 3
 Dakar Rally
 Formula E
 Extreme E
 World Rally Championship
24 Hours of Le Mans
Red Bull Rampage
Race Of Champions
European Rally Championship
Porsche Supercup
Goodwood Festival of Speed

Other sports 
 World Wrestling Entertainment (WWE)
 National Football League (NFL)
 Professional Fighters League(PFL)
 Boxxer
 IHF Men's Super Globe
Saudi Premier League (Basketball)
Saudi Handball League
2022 Asian Men's Handball Championship
Aramco Saudi Ladies International
Saudi International
Aramco Team Series
FIBA 3X3 World Tour
Saudi Cup
Longines Global Champions Tour
Saudi Tour
UCI Continental Circuits
World Snooker Championship
Sail GP 
LIV Golf 
2022 UCI Mountain Bike World Cup 
World Cup of Pool
World Men's Handball Championship

User acquisition and growth rate 
In 2019, by the end of Ramadan, Shahid gathered 27 million unique monthly users, which reflected an increase of 23% in the audience scale as compared to same time period 2018. During this time, the platform received more than 248 million views, a 46% increase on Shahid and 62% increase in Shahid VIP subscribers.

Growth after rebranding and relaunch

The rebranding in 2020 increased Shahid VIP subscribers by tenfold, with 60 percent increase in the International audiences from United States, Canada, United Kingdom, Australia, Germany, France, Sweden and a few other territories in Europe. The brand awareness was measured through brand analysis in KSA, UAE and Egypt with the first phase conducted in December 2019 prior to the relaunch and second phase in March 2020 after the re-launch in January 2020, which showed that the increase in the brand awareness got translated into new users’ acquisition. The expansion to various screen sizes increased viewership to 70% on Shahid VIP, which come from mobile devices and almost 50% of playbacks take place on large screen TVs.

Shahid VIP launched in North America and Australia

Shahid VIP became available in North America on Nov 1, 2020, giving the Arabic population residing in the US and Canada access to more than 25,000 hours of Arabic content including Shahid Original series, Shahid Premieres, a large library of movies, as well as the top watched live Arab TV channels.

Available and streaming worldwide including in UK and Europe

Shahid VIP also rolled out to parts of UK and Europe after its rebranding in January 2020.

In 2020, Shahid VIP received the Gold award in the ‘Best visual identity from the technology, media and telecommunications sector’ and Silver in the ‘Best brand development project to reflect changed mission, values or positioning’ in 2020. The rebranding of the platform (Shahid VIP) was acknowledged by Transform Awards and awarding ‘Gold’ to Shahid in the category of the ‘Best rebrand of a digital property’.

References

External links

Streaming software
Middle East Broadcasting Center